The Moenkopi Formation is a geological formation that is spread across the U.S. states of New Mexico, northern Arizona, Nevada, southeastern California, eastern Utah and western Colorado. This unit is considered to be a group in Arizona. Part of the Colorado Plateau and Basin and Range, this red sandstone was laid down in the Lower Triassic and possibly part of the Middle Triassic, around 240 million years ago.

History of investigation

There is no designated type locality for this formation. It was named for a development at the mouth of Moencopie Wash in the Grand Canyon area by Ward in 1901. In 1917 a 'substitute' type locality was located by Gregory in the wall of the Little Colorado Canyon, about 5 miles below Tanner Crossing in Coconino County, Arizona. While in the Great Basin, Bassler and Reeside characterized and named the Rock Canyon Conglomerate, Virgin Limestone, and Shnabkaib Shale members in 1921. Salt Creek (later replaced by Wupatki and Moqui Members) and the Holbrook Member were found and named in the Black Mesa basin by Hager in 1922.

The Sinbad Limestone Member was named in the Paradox Basin by Gilluly and Reeside in 1928. Williams and Gregory named the Timpoweap Member in the Plateau sedimentary province in 1947.

The Wupatki Member was first used in the Plateau Sedimentary Province and its age was modified to Early and Middle(?) Triassic by McKee in 1951. Contacts were revised by Robeck in 1956 and Cooley in 1958. The Tenderfoot, Ali Baba, Sewemup, and Pariott Members were named in the Piceance and Uinta Basins by Shoemaker and Newman in 1959. The Hoskinnini Member was assigned in the Black Mesa and Paradox basins by Stewart in 1959. Contacts were revised again by Schell and Yochelson in 1966. Blakey named the Black Dragon, Torrey, and Moody Canyon members in the Paradox Basin and Plateau Sedimentary Province in 1974. Contacts were revised yet again by Welsh and others in 1979.

Kietzke modified the age to Early and Middle Triassic using biostratigraphic dating in 1988. The Anton Chico Member was assigned in the Palo Duro Basin and areal limits set by Lucas and Hunt in 1989. In 1991 areal limits were set again by Lucas and Hayden. An overview was completed by Lucas in 1991, Sprinkel in 1994, Hintze and Axen in 1995 and later, Huntoon and others.

Description

The Moenkopi consists of thinly bedded sandstone, mudstone, and shale, with some limestone in the Capitol Reef area. It has a characteristic deep red color and tends to form slopes and benches. The depositional environment varies from fluvial channel and floodplain deposits in the eastern exposures to tidal mudflats in the Cedar Mesa area to deltaic sandstones and shallow marine limestones at Capitol Reef. In eastern Nevada and northwestern Utah, it thickens dramatically, then transitions to the Woodside, Thaynes, and Mahogany formations.

The general deposition setting was sluggish rivers traversing a flat, featureless coastal plain to the sea. The low relief meant that the shoreline moved great distances with changes of sea level or even with the tides.

The Moenkopi rests unconformably on Paleozoic beds and the Chinle Formation in turn rests unconformably on the Moenkopi. Both unconformities are locally angular unconformities. The lower unconformity corresponds to the regional Tr-1 unconformity and the upper to the regional Tr-3 unconformity. The Tr-1 unconformity represents a hiatus of at least 20 million years while Tr-2 represents a hiatus of about 10 million years.

Members
Members differ considerably from east to west, in part because sandstone beds corresponding to marine transgressions are used to define members to the west but cannot be traced to the east. In different regions, by ascending stratigraphic order, the members are:

Paradox Basin:
 Tenderfoot Member. This is everywhere in contact with the Cutler Formation on an angular unconformity.
 Ali Baba Member. This is red conglomeratic sandstone and red siltstone and was laid down by energetic rivers. A distinctive feature is load structures. Sediment sources were apparently the crests of anticlines, and paleocurrent directions are north to northwest, along the corresponding synclines.
 Sewemup Member. This is thinly bedded siltstone, shale, and sandstone, with enough gypsum content to give it a light brown color that contrasts with the darker brown Ali Baba Member.
 Parriott Member. This is distinguished from the light brown Sewemup Member by its multihued brown, red, orange and purple strata. Exposures are geographically limited, appearing only in Richardson Amphitheater, Castle Valley, Sinbad Valley, and Big Bend meander of the Colorado River. This member may be separated from the Sewemup Member by a regional unconformity.

Canyonlands and Glen Canyon area:
 Hoskinnini Member: Sandstone and siltstone. Found only in the southern part of the area.
 Black Dragon Member. Consists of a basal conglomerate; thinly bedded red sandstone, siltstone, and shale deposited in a tidal flat environment; a sandstone sheet; and a second sequence of tidal flat deposits.
 Sinbad Limestone Member. Named for the Sinbad region in the San Rafael Swell. Consists of yellowish limestone deposited by a brief marine transgression.
 Torrey Member. Red beds signifying a return to subaerial deposition.
 Moody Canyon Member. Thinly bedded slope forming siltstone and mudstone with minor evaporites.

San Juan Basin and Tucumcari:
 Anton Chico Member. Described previously as the red sandstone member of the Santa Rosa Formation, but placed in its own formation after it was recognized to be middle Triassic in age. Subsequently, named as a member of the Moenkopi when its beds were traced west and demonstrated that it was deposited in a single basin with Moenkopi beds in Arizona.

Other members listed in alphabetical order, with asterisks (*) indicating usage by the U.S. Geological Survey and other usages by state geological surveys:
 Holbrook Sandstone Member (AZ*)
 Moqui Member (AZ*)
 Rock Canyon Conglomerate Member (AZ*, NV*, UT*)
 Shnabkaib Member (AZ*, NV*, UT*)
 Timpoweap Member (AZ, NV, UT*)
 Virgin Limestone Member (AZ*, NV*, UT*)
 Winslow Member (AZ)
 Wupatki Member (AZ*)

Places visible

Found in these geologic locations:
 Black Mesa Basin*
 Great Basin province*
 Green River Basin*
 Las Vegas-Raton Basin
 Orogrande Basin
 Palo Duro Basin
 Paradox Basin*
 Piceance Basin*
 Plateau sedimentary province*
 San Juan Basin*
 Uinta Basin*

Found within these parks (incomplete list):
 Grand Canyon National Park
 Capitol Reef National Park
 Zion National Park
 Monument Valley Navajo Nation Tribal Park
 Dinosaur National Monument
 Glen Canyon National Recreation Area
 Walnut Canyon National Monument
 Wupatki National Monument

Fauna

A diverse fossil vertebrate fauna has been described from the Moenkopi Formation, mainly from the Wupatki Member and Holbrook Member of northern Arizona. Described basal vertebrates include freshwater hybodont sharks, coelacanths, and lungfish. Temnospondyl amphibians are a common component of the fauna. Temnospondyli include Eocyclotosaurus, Quasicyclotosaurus, Wellesaurus, Vigilius, and Cosgriffius. The rhynchosaur Ammorhynchus is known, but rare. Anisodontosaurus is an enigmatic reptile only known from a few tooth-bearing jaws. The poposauroid archosaur Arizonasaurus is known from one relatively complete skeleton and a significant amount of other isolated material. Footprints and several fragmentary body fossils are known from dicynodonts. The footprints of Cheirotherium and Rhynchosauroides are common in the Wupatki Member.

See also
 Geology of the Grand Canyon

Footnotes

References
 
 
 
 
 
 
 * 
 
 
 
 
 
 
 GEOLEX database entry for Moenkopi, USGS [Accessed 18 March 2006] (public domain text)
 Bibliographic References for Moenkopi [Accessed 18 March 2006]

External links

Geologic formations of Arizona
Geologic formations of California
Geologic formations of Colorado
Geologic formations of Nevada
Triassic formations of New Mexico
Geologic formations of Utah
Triassic System of North America
Early Triassic North America
Middle Triassic North America
Triassic Arizona
Triassic California
Triassic geology of Nevada
Triassic geology of Utah
Sandstone formations of the United States
Natural history of the Grand Canyon
Capitol Reef National Park
Colorado Plateau
Zion National Park